Login VSI maximizes the end-user experience for all digital workspaces. Login VSI's flagship product, Login Enterprise, is an automated testing platform that predicts performance, ensures business continuity and reduces risk. Login Enterprise tests the desktop and applications as a whole, from pre-production through to production. Login Enterprise includes standard “out-of-the-box” application template workloads. The technology is used by large organizations using Citrix XenApp, Citrix XenDesktop, VMware Horizon and Microsoft RDS. Login VSI has over 400 customers in 50 countries.

Login VSI  evolved from the consulting firm Login Consultants. The first product was commercially released in 2008 and was free. As large enterprises began adopting the product, the need to commercialize the product became evident. Login VSI was formed in 2012.

In 2016, Login VSI announced the public launch of its second product, Login PI. Login PI is an active monitoring tool that constantly runs a single virtual user, to monitor and safeguard a good performance and availability of virtual desktop infrastructures and associated business applications. Both products use virtual users (or synthetic users) to test systems, without the need for real users.

In 2018, Login VSI announced the Login VSI Enterprise Edition (a combination of Login VSI and Login PI), and the Login VSI Vendor Edition (focused on the industry-standard tests done by this audience).

References

External links 
 Login VSI Homepage
 List of benchmark reports based on Login VSI test results

Software testing
Load testing tools